Chamaedorea cataractarum, the cat palm, cascade palm, or cataract palm, is a small palm tree.  It is native to Southern Mexico and Central America.

Description
This palm reproduces sexually via seed as well as asexually when new plants sprout from the base of older plants. Flower stalks are either male or female, but both occur in the same group of plants. After releasing pollen, male stalks wither. If female flowers are pollinated, the stalks turn a bright orange color as the seeds mature. It will eventually form quite a large dense, clump given time. (It is occasionally used as a hedge plant.) This trunkless habit, along with its flexible long thin leaflets is an adaption that allows as little resistance as possible to flowing water, helping to prevent it from being washed away during floods. As the trunk grows, it creeps across the ground helping to anchor the plant even more securely against the forces of water.

Immature fruit is ovoid, shiny and dark green.  Fruit remains sessile on the flower stalk.  It turns black when mature and measures about  through the long axis,  in diameter.

Cultivation
Cat palms require high light for indoor house plants. They are particularly susceptible to dry soil, and water must be applied regularly. Fertilizer should be applied every one or two months.

It is grown as a garden plant in tropical and subtropical regions and climates.

References

3. Real Palm Trees - general palm tree information regarding the cat palm

External links

cataractarum
Plants described in 1849
Trees of Southeastern Mexico
Trees of Southwestern Mexico
Flora of Central America
House plants
Garden plants of North America